Mangal Rajgan (or Manghal, Mangla) is a given name and a surname. Notable people with the name include:

People with the given name

Mangal (singer), Afghan singer
Mangal Bagh (born 1973), Pakistani militant leader
Mangal Dhillon, Indian actor and film producer
Mangal Hussain, Afghan politician and military leader
Mangal Kalindi, Indian politician
Mangal Pandey (1827–1857), Indian soldier
Mangal Prasad Tharu, Nepalese politician
Mangal Raj Joshi (1920–2005), Nepali astrologer
Mangal Singh Champia (born 1983), Indian archer 
Mangal Singh Prabhakar (born 1859), Maharaja of Alwar 
Mangal Singh Ramgarhia (1800–1879), Indian Sikh leader

People with the surname

Habib Mangal (born 1946), Afghan politician 
Mohammad Gulab Mangal (born 1958), Afghan politician
Nawroz Mangal (born 1984), Afghan cricket player